Araltogay, also known as Araltoghay and Araltugay, (Araltoğai, ارالتوعاي; , Araltogay) is a town in Aktobe Region, west Kazakhstan.

References

Aktobe Region
Cities and towns in Kazakhstan